The 2003 Kilkenny Senior Hurling Championship was the 109th staging of the Kilkenny Senior Hurling Championship since its establishment by the Kilkenny County Board in 1887. The championship began on 25 July 2003 and ended on 2 November 2003.

Young Irelands were the defending champions.

On 2 November 2003, O'Loughlin Gaels won the title after a 2–12 to 2–10 defeat of Young Irelands in a final replay at Nowlan Park. It was their second championship title overall and their first title in two championship seasons.

Team changes

To Championship

Promoted from the Kilkenny Intermediate Hurling Championship
 St. Martin's

From Championship

Relegated to the Kilkenny Intermediate Hurling Championship
 Erin's Own

Results

First round

Relegation play-off

Quarter-finals

Semi-finals

Final

Championship statistics

Top scorers

Top scorers overall

References

Kilkenny Senior Hurling Championship
Kilkenny Senior Hurling Championship